The 2011–12 Premier Arena Soccer League season consisted of 35 teams grouped into 6 divisions across the US. The Premier Arena Soccer League continues to serve as the developmental league to the Professional Arena Soccer League.

Standings
As of March 10, 2012

(Bold Division Winner, automatic National Finals Qualifier)

Division Playoffs
Northwest Division Semifinals
Sat. Feb. 18, 7:00 pm: Kitsap Pumas 7, South Sound Shock 6 (Penalty Kicks)
Sat. Feb. 18, 7:15 pm: WSA Rapids 10, Snohomish Skyhawks 6
Finals
Sat. Feb. 25, 7:00 pm: WSA Rapids 8, Kitsap Pumas 4

Southwest Division Postseason
"Battle of the Borders"
Sat. Feb. 25, 6:00 pm: CF Revolucion Tijuana 8, Las Vegas Knights 7 (Penalty Kicks)
Division Championship
Sat. Mar. 3, 5:30 pm: Las Vegas Knights 18, Deft Touch 6

Great Lakes Division Finals
Sat. Mar. 3, 6:00 pm: Cincinnati Saints 12, Cincinnati Kings Reserves 8

Midwest Division Finals
Sat. Feb. 25, 7:30 pm: Louisville Rayo 7, Illinois Fire 6 (Penalty Kicks)

Rocky Mountain Division Finals
Fri. Feb. 17, 10:45 pm: Colorado Blizzard 7, Denver Dynamite 3 (Doubles as Regular Season Match)

2011-12 PASL-Premier Finals
The finals were played at San Diego, California, on March 9–10, 2012.

Preliminary round
 (Preliminary Round games consists of two 18 minute halves.)

 
Fri. March 9, 2012
10:15 AM – WSA Rapids 3, San Diego Sockers Reserves 0
11:00 AM – Colorado Blizzard 2, Las Vegas Knights 1  
11:45 AM – Deft Touch 9, CF Revolucion Tijuana 4
12:30 PM – Vitesse Dallas 5, Louisville Rayo 4
1:15 PM – Las Vegas Knights 5, WSA Rapids 4
2:00 PM – Colorado Blizzard 2, San Diego Sockers Reserves 2
2:45 PM – Vitesse Dallas 8, CF Revolucion Tijuana 2 
3:30 PM – Deft Touch 5, Louisville Rayo 3

Sat. March 10, 2012
10:15 AM – Las Vegas Knights 4, San Diego Sockers Reserves 1
11:00 AM – WSA Rapids 5, Colorado Blizzard 4
11:45 AM – Vitesse Dallas 8, Deft Touch 2
12:30 PM – Louisville Rayo 4, CF Revolucion Tijuana 4

Knockout round
Sat. March 10, 2012 Semifinals (two 18 minute halves)
2:00 PM – Las Vegas Knights 4, Deft Touch 3 (Shootout 3-2)
2:45 PM – Vitesse Dallas 4, vs. WSA Rapids 1

Final (four 10-minute periods)
5:05 PM – Vitesse Dallas 5, Las Vegas Knights 3

References

Premier Arena Soccer League seasons
Premier Arena Soccer League
Premier Arena Soccer League